The Liard Country, sometimes known simply as "the Liard", is the usual name for a region of far northern British Columbia, Canada, generally describing the immediate environs of the Liard River along the Alaska Highway, and west of the line of the Rockies.

Settlements in the region are few and far between, none are incorporated and nearly all are along the Alaska Highway:
Toad River
Liard River
Fireside
Lower Post

The eastern part of the region is within the Northern Rockies Regional Municipality.

References
Usage examples from Google Books search

 
Cassiar Land District